The 2013 Victoria Azarenka tennis season officially began at the 2013 Brisbane International, the first of two simultaneous events which opened the official 2013 season, and concluded with her fifth consecutive qualification for the 2013 WTA Tour Championships.

Yearly summary

Australian Open series
Azarenka began her 2013 season as the top seed at the 2013 Brisbane International, her first participation at the event since winning in 2009. She defeated German Sabine Lisicki in the second round after receiving a bye in the first round. This was followed up with a crushing two set victory over Ksenia Pervak in the quarter-finals, to maintain her record of not dropping a set in the tournament thus far. Azarenka was later forced to withdraw from her scheduled semi-final against Serena Williams due to a toe injury.

Her next tournament was the defence of her Australian Open title. Azarenka won her first six matches dropping only one set en route (against Jamie Hampton in the third round), to reach the final for the second consecutive year, where she faced Li Na of China. Azarenka was able to successfully defend her title with a three set victory in the final; thus, she became the first woman since Serena Williams in 2009–10 to successfully defend her Australian Open title. With the victory, she also became only the fifth active player (after Serena and Venus Williams, Maria Sharapova and Svetlana Kuznetsova) to hold two or more Grand Slam singles titles.

Middle East series
As the defending champion in Qatar, Azarenka once again reached the championship match, where she met Serena Williams, who replaced her as World No. 1 upon reaching the semi-finals (Williams did not play in Doha last year). After receiving a bye in the first round, she defeated Romina Oprandi, Christina McHale (without losing a game), Sara Errani and Agnieszka Radwańska to set up the final meeting against Williams. Azarenka scored just her second career victory over Williams, winning in the championship match in three sets and successfully defending her title.

Azarenka missed the Dubai Tennis Championships for the second year in a row, withdrawing from the tournament due to a foot injury she sustained in Doha.

American hard court season
Azarenka's first tournament of the American hard court season was the defense of her Indian Wells title. As the top seed in the absence of Serena Williams, Azarenka got a first round bye, following which she defeated Daniela Hantuchová, Kirsten Flipkens (in three sets) and Urszula Radwańska, before withdrawing from the tournament prior to her quarter-final match against eventual runner-up Caroline Wozniacki due to an ankle injury. Her failure to defend her points saw her world ranking drop to No. 3 at the end of this tournament.

The ankle injury she suffered at Indian Wells forced her out of the Miami tournament the following week.

Clay court season
Azarenka decided to skip the Stuttgart event, to allow for recovery from her ankle injury. Her next tournament was the Mutua Madrid Open, where she was a finalist last year. She defeated recent Portugal Open champion Anastasia Pavlyuchenkova in two tiebreak sets, in her first match since Indian Wells, before being upset in the second round by World No. 24 Ekaterina Makarova in three sets; thus losing her first match this season after eighteen matches undefeated.

Her next tournament was Rome. After receiving a first round bye, she defeated Julia Görges, Ayumi Morita (who retired in the second set), Samantha Stosur and Sara Errani to reach the final, where she was defeated by Serena Williams in straight sets.

Azarenka's next tournament was the French Open. She defeated Elena Vesnina, Annika Beck, Alizé Cornet, 2010 champion Francesca Schiavone and former doubles partner Maria Kirilenko to reach her first French Open semi-final, however, she was defeated there by 2012 champion Maria Sharapova in three sets.

Grass court season
In the first round of the 2013 Wimbledon Championships she defeated Maria João Koehler in straight sets, but suffered a knee injury early in the second set. This injury ultimately forced her to withdraw from the Championships before her second round match against Flavia Pennetta. Her withdrawal was among seven big-name casualties on the tournament's third day, which has also led to questions being raised about the surface of the grass. Her withdrawal also ended a streak of four consecutive Grand Slam semi-finals.

US Open series

Following her injury-enforced early exit from Wimbledon, Azarenka returned to action at the 2013 Southern California Open, where she was the top seed. After receiving a first round bye, she defeated Francesca Schiavone, Urszula Radwańska and Ana Ivanovic (the latter in three sets) before losing to Samantha Stosur in straight sets in the championship match. The loss to Stosur marked her first loss against her, after previously winning their first eight encounters.

Azarenka was later forced to withdraw from the Rogers Cup due to a back injury she suffered in the championship match in Carlsbad.

Seeded second at Cincinnati, Azarenka received a first round bye, following which she won her first match at the tournament since 2009, when she defeated local hope Vania King in the second round. That was then followed by wins over Magdaléna Rybáriková, Caroline Wozniacki (her first victory against her since 2009) and Jelena Janković, en route to reaching her fifth final of the year, where she defeated Serena Williams in a thrilling championship match to pick up her third title for the year.

At the US Open, where Azarenka was seeded second, she successfully reached the final for the second consecutive year, only dropping two sets en route. However, she lost in the final to Serena Williams in three sets. She was the only player to win a set against Williams over the last two years.

Asian hard court season
Following the US Open, Azarenka began her Asian swing at the Toray Pan Pacific Open in Tokyo, where she was the top seed. However, after receiving a first round bye, she lost in the second round to former number one and seven-time Grand Slam champion Venus Williams in straight sets.

Azarenka's next tournament was the China Open, where she was the defending champion. She lost in the first round to Andrea Petkovic in three sets, delivering 15 double faults and committing 44 unforced errors in the process.

WTA Tour Championships
Following Azarenka's run to the US Open final, she qualified for the WTA Tour Championships for the fifth consecutive year. She was placed in the White Group along with Li Na, Sara Errani and Jelena Janković. She started off with a tight straight-sets victory over Errani, but then fell to Janković and Li in her remaining matches, thus failing to reach the semi-finals for the first time since 2010 and spelling an end to her season.

The defeat to Li marked Azarenka's fifth loss in her past six matches, thus making for a poor end to her 2013 season. She ended the year ranked world number two, behind Serena Williams.

All matches

Singles matches

Tournament schedule

Singles schedule

Victoria Azarenka's 2013 singles tournament schedule is as follows:

Yearly Records

Head-to-head match-ups
Bold indicates that the player was in the Top 10, italics denotes that the player was in the Top 20 (at the time of the match being played). This list is ordered by number of wins to number of losses in chronological order played.

  Sara Errani 3–0
  Alizé Cornet 2–0
  Daniela Hantuchová 2–0
  Ana Ivanovic 2–0
  Urszula Radwańska 2–0
  Francesca Schiavone 2–0
  Elena Vesnina 2–0
  Serena Williams 2–2
  Jelena Janković 1–1
  Li Na 1–1
  Annika Beck 1–0
  Eleni Daniilidou 1–0
  Kirsten Flipkens 1–0
  Julia Görges 1–0
  Jamie Hampton 1–0
  Vania King 1–0
  Maria Kirilenko 1–0
  Maria João Koehler 1–0
  Svetlana Kuznetsova 1–0
  Sabine Lisicki 1–0
  Christina McHale  1–0
  Ayumi Morita 1–0
  Monica Niculescu 1–0
  Romina Oprandi 1–0
  Anastasia Pavlyuchenkova 1–0
  Flavia Pennetta 1–0
  Ksenia Pervak 1–0
  Dinah Pfizenmaier 1–0
  Agnieszka Radwańska 1–0
  Magdaléna Rybáriková 1–0
  Sloane Stephens 1–0
  Caroline Wozniacki 1–0
  Aleksandra Wozniak 1–0
  Samantha Stosur 1–1
  Ekaterina Makarova 0–1
  Andrea Petkovic 0–1
  Maria Sharapova 0–1
  Venus Williams 0–1

Singles

Singles: 6 (3–3)

Earnings

 Figures in United States dollars (USD) unless noted.

Exhibition matches
Victoria Azarenka took part in the annual BNP Paribas Showdown, where she faced Serena Williams in a rematch of their 2012 US Open final. Azarenka lost the exhibition match in straight sets. At the end of the year Azarenka scored another victory on Williams, in an exhibition in Thailand. She won in straight sets.

See also
2013 Li Na tennis season
2013 Serena Williams tennis season
2013 WTA Tour

References

Azarenka
Victoria Azarenka tennis seasons
2013 in Belarusian sport
Tennis in Belarus